Klaus Biemann (November 2, 1926 – June 2, 2016) was an Austrian-American professor of chemistry at the Massachusetts Institute of Technology. His work centered on structural analysis in organic and biochemistry. He has been called the "father of organic mass spectrometry" but was particularly noted for his role in advancing protein sequencing with tandem mass spectrometry following pioneering work conducted in this area by Michael Barber.

Career and research
Biemann was born in Innsbruck, Austria in 1926. Following in the footsteps of his father, he studied Pharmacy at the University of Innsbruck where he graduated in 1948. He was drafted into the Wehrmacht during World War II and fought the US and its allies on the Eastern Front before retreating and deserting on the Eastern Front to travel back to Innsbruck. He received his PhD at the University of Innsbruck supervised by Hermann Bretschneider in 1951. He started his work on his habilitation, but instead moved to the MIT in 1955 to work as a postdoctoral fellow in the group of George Büchi. Two years later with the assistance of Büchi, he was offered a faculty position at MIT in the analytical chemistry division where he turned his focus to peptide analysis and sequencing. Before embarking on his new research, however, Biemann decided to buy a mass spectrometer and use it to study peptides instead. He used his background in organic chemistry to modify peptides so that they become volatile and entered the gas phase, making them amenable to electron ionization, the only feasible ionization technique at the time. He partnered on the NASA Viking mission project to Mars which failed to detect organic matter on its the surface in 1976.

Awards and honors
 Stas Medal of the Belgian Chemical Society (1962)
 Fellow of the American Academy of Arts and Sciences (1966)
 Fritz Pregl Medal of the Austrian Microchemical Society (1977)
 NASA Exceptional Scientific Achievement Medal (1977)
 Guggenheim Fellow (1983)
 Field and Franklin Award in Applied Mass Spectrometry from the American Chemical Society (1986)
ACS Analytical Chemistry Award from the American Chemical Society (2001)
 Thomson Medal from the International Mass Spectrometry Foundation (1991)
Pehr Edman Award (1992)
 Member of the National Academy of Sciences (1993)
 Beckman-ABRF Award from the Association of Biomolecular Resource Facilities (1995)
 Benjamin Franklin Medal in Chemistry from the Franklin Institute (2007)

References

1926 births
2016 deaths
American biochemists
Fellows of the American Academy of Arts and Sciences
Members of the United States National Academy of Sciences
Mass spectrometrists
Thomson Medal recipients